In Mandaeism, Shamish or Šamiš is the Mandaic name for the Sun. Shamish is one of the seven planets, who are part of the entourage of Ruha in the World of Darkness.

Shamish is associated with the uthras Yawar-Ziwa (Dazzling Light) and Simat-Hiia (Treasure of Life). He is also identified with the uthra Yurba, who is described in detail in chapter 52 of the Mandaean Book of John.

In the Right Ginza, the Yazuqaeans (i.e., Zoroastrians) are associated with Shamish, an allusion to Mithra.

Etymology
Shamish's name is derived from š-m-š, the Semitic root for 'sun'. Shamish is also cognate with the Akkadian Šamaš.

References

Planets in Mandaeism
Sun in culture